Bridget Louise Riley  (born 24 April 1931) is an English painter known for her op art paintings. She lives and works in London, Cornwall and the Vaucluse in France.

Early life and education
Riley was born on 24 April 1931 in Norwood, London. Her father, John Fisher Riley, originally from Yorkshire, had been an Army officer. He was a printer by trade and owned his own business. In 1938, he relocated the printing business, together with his family, to Lincolnshire.

At the beginning of World War II, her father, a member of the Territorial Army, was mobilised, and Riley, together with her mother and sister Sally, moved to a cottage in Cornwall. The cottage, not far from the sea near Padstow, was shared with an aunt who was a former student at Goldsmiths' College, London. Primary education came in the form of irregular talks and lectures by non-qualified or retired teachers. She attended Cheltenham Ladies' College (1946–1948) and then studied art at Goldsmiths' College (1949–52), and later at the Royal College of Art (1952–55).

Between 1956 and 1958, she nursed her father, who had been involved in a serious car crash. She suffered a breakdown due to the deterioration of her father's health. After this she worked in a glassware shop. She eventually joined the J. Walter Thompson advertising agency, as an illustrator, where she worked part-time until 1962. The Whitechapel Gallery exhibition of Jackson Pollock in the winter of 1958 had an impact on her.

Her early work was figurative and semi-impressionist. Between 1958 and 1959, her work at the advertising agency showed her adoption of a style of painting based on the pointillist technique. Around 1960, she began to develop her signature Op Art style consisting of black and white geometric patterns that explore the dynamism of sight and produce a disorienting effect on the eye and produces movement and colour. In the summer of 1960, she toured Italy with her mentor Maurice de Sausmarez, and the two friends visited the Venice Biennale with its large exhibition of Futurist works.

Early in her career, Riley worked as an art teacher for children from 1957 to 1958 at the Convent of the Sacred Heart, Harrow (now known as Sacred Heart Language College). At the Convent of the Sacred Heart, she began a basic design course. Later she worked at the Loughborough School of Art (1959), Hornsey College of Art, and Croydon College of Art (1962–64).

In 1961, she and her partner Peter Sedgley visited the Vaucluse plateau in the South of France, and acquired a derelict farm which they eventually transformed into a studio. Back in London, in the spring of 1962, Victor Musgrave of Gallery One held her first solo exhibition.

In 1968, Riley, with Sedgley and the journalist Peter Townsend, created the artists' organisation SPACE (Space Provision Artistic Cultural and Educational), with the goal of providing artists large and affordable studio space.

Seurat's way of seeing

Riley's mature style, developed during the 1960s, was influenced by sources like the French Neo-Impressionist artist Georges Seurat. In 2015–6, the Courtauld Gallery, in its exhibition Bridget Riley: Learning from Seurat, made the case for how Seurat's pointillism influenced her towards abstract painting. As a young artist in 1959, Riley saw The Bridge at Courbevoie, owned by the Courtauld, and decided to paint a copy. The resulting work has hung in Riley's studio ever since, barring its loan to the gallery for the exhibition, demonstrating in the opinion of the art critic Jonathan Jones "how crucial" Seurat was to her approach to art. Riley described her copy of Seurat's painting as a "tool", interpreted by Jones as meaning that she, like Seurat, practised art "as an optical science"; in his view, Riley "really did forge her optical style by studying Seurat", making the exhibition a real meeting of old and new. Jones comments that Riley investigated Seurat's pointillism by painting from a book illustration of Seurat's Bridge at an expanded scale to work out how his technique made use of complementary colours, and went on to create pointillist landscapes of her own, such as Pink Landscape (1960), painted soon after her Seurat study and portraying the "sun-filled hills of Tuscany" (and shown in the exhibition poster) which Jones writes could readily be taken for a post-impressionist original. In his view, Riley shares Seurat's "joy for life", a simple but radical delight in colour and seeing.

Work

It was during this period that Riley began to paint the black and white works for which she first became known. They present a great variety of geometric forms that produce sensations of movement or colour. In the early 1960s, her works were said to induce a variety of sensations in viewers, from seasickness to the feeling of sky diving. From 1961 to 1964, she worked with the contrast of black and white, occasionally introducing tonal scales of grey. Works in this style comprised her first 1962 solo show at Musgrave's Gallery One, as well as numerous subsequent shows. For example, in Fall, a single perpendiculars curve is repeated to create a field of varying optical frequencies. Visually, these works relate to many concerns of the period: a perceived need for audience participation (this relates them to the Happenings, which were common in this era), challenges to the notion of the mind-body duality which led Aldous Huxley to experiment with hallucinogenic drugs; concerns with a tension between a scientific future which might be very beneficial or might lead to a nuclear war; and fears about the loss of genuine individual experience in a Brave New World. Her paintings since 1961, have been executed by assistants. She meticulously plans her composition's design with preparatory drawings and collage techniques; her assistants paint the final canvases with great precision under her instruction.

Riley began investigating colour in 1967, the year in which she produced her first stripe painting. Following a major retrospective in the early 1970s, Riley began travelling extensively. After a trip to Egypt in the early 1980s, where she was inspired by colourful hieroglyphic decoration, Riley began to explore colour and contrast. In some works, lines of colour are used to create a shimmering effect, while in others the canvas is filled with tessellating patterns. Typical of these later colourful works is Shadow Play.

Some works are titled after particular dates, others after specific locations (for instance, Les Bassacs, the village near Saint-Saturnin-lès-Apt in the south of France where Riley has a studio).

Following a visit to Egypt in 1980–81, Riley created colours in what she called her 'Egyptian palette' and produced works such as the Ka and Ra series, which capture the spirit of the country, ancient and modern, and reflect the colours of the Egyptian landscape. Invoking the sensorial memory of her travels, the paintings produced between 1980 and 1985 exhibit Riley's free reconstruction of the restricted chromatic palette discovered abroad. In 1983, for the first time in fifteen years, Riley returned to Venice to once again study the paintings that form the basis of European colourism. Towards the end of the 1980s, Riley's work underwent a dramatic change with the reintroduction of the diagonal in the form of a sequence of parallelograms used to disrupt and animate the vertical stripes that had characterized her previous paintings. In Delos (1983), for example, blue, turquoise, and emerald hues alternate with rich yellows, reds and white.

Murals

Riley has painted temporary murals for the Tate, the Musée d'Art Moderne de la Ville de Paris and the National Gallery. In 2014, the Imperial College Healthcare Charity Art Collection commissioned her to make a permanent 56-metre mural for St Mary's Hospital, London; the work was installed on the 10th floor of the hospital's Queen Elizabeth Queen Mother Wing, joining two others she had painted more than 20 years earlier. In 2017, she installed a striped mural that circumnavigated a U-shaped former army barracks at the Chinati Foundation in Marfa, Texas, that expanded on a work executed for the Royal Liverpool Hospital in 1983.

Between 2017 and 2019 Riley's wall painting for the Chinati Foundation, Marfa, Texas was the artist's largest work to date and spanned six of the eight walls of the building. The mural referenced Royal Liverpool University Hospital's wall painting Bolt of Colour (1983) and revisited the artist's Egyptian palette.

On the nature and role of the artist
Riley made the following comments regarding artistic work in her lecture Painting Now, 23rd William Townsend Memorial Lecture, Slade School of Fine Art, London, 26 November 1996:

Writer and curator
Riley has written on artists from Nicolas Poussin to Bruce Nauman. She co-curated Piet Mondrian: From Nature to Abstraction (with Sean Rainbird) at the Tate Gallery in 1996. Alongside art historian Robert Kudielka, Riley also served as curator of the 2002 exhibition "Paul Klee: The Nature of Creation", an exhibition at the Hayward Gallery in London in 2002. In 2010, she curated an artists choice show at the National Gallery in London, choosing large figure paintings by Titian, Veronese, El Greco, Rubens, Poussin, and Paul Cézanne.

Exhibitions

In 1965, Riley exhibited in the Museum of Modern Art in New York City show, The Responsive Eye (created by curator William C. Seitz); the exhibition which first drew worldwide attention to her work and the Op Art movement. Her painting Current, 1964, was reproduced on the cover of the show's catalogue. Riley became increasingly disillusioned, however, with the exploitation of her art for commercial purposes, discovering that in the USA there was no copyright protection for artists. The first US copyright legislation was eventually passed, following an independent initiative by New York artists, in 1967.

She participated in documentas IV (1968) and VI (1977). In 1968, Riley represented Great Britain in the Venice Biennale, where she was the first British contemporary painter, and the first woman, to be awarded the International Prize for painting. Her disciplined work lost ground to the assertive gestures of the Neo-Expressionists in the 1980s, but a 1999 show at the Serpentine Gallery of her early paintings triggered a resurgence of interest in her optical experiments. "Bridget Riley: Reconnaissance", an exhibition of paintings from the 1960s and 1970s, was presented at Dia:Chelsea in 2000. In 2001, she participated in Site Santa Fe, and in 2003 the Tate Britain organised a major Riley retrospective. In 2005, her work was featured at Gallery Oldham. Between November 2010 and May 2011, her exhibition "Paintings and Related Work" was presented at the National Gallery, London.

In June and July 2014, the retrospective show "Bridget Riley: The Stripe Paintings 1961–2014" was presented at the David Zwirner Gallery in London. In July and August 2015, the retrospective show "Bridget Riley: The Curve Paintings 1961–2014" was presented at the De La Warr Pavilion in Bexhill-on-Sea.

In November 2015, the exhibition Bridget Riley opened at David Zwirner in New York. The show features paintings and works on paper by the artist from 1981 to present; the fully illustrated catalogue features an essay by the art historian Richard Shiff and biographical notes compiled by Robert Kudielka.

A retrospective exhibition at the Scottish National Gallery, in partnership with the Hayward Gallery, ran from June to September 2019. It showed early paintings and drawings, black-and-white works of the 1960s, and studies that reveal her working methods. This major exhibition of her work, spanning her 70-year career, was also shown at Hayward Gallery from October 2019 to January 2020.

Public collections

 Abbot Hall Art Gallery, Kendal
 Arts Council Collection, London
 British Council Collection, London
 Ferens Art Gallery, Hull
 Fitzwilliam Museum, Cambridge
 Glasgow Museums Resource Centre, Glasgow
 Government Art Collection, London
 Leeds Art Gallery
 Maclaurin Art Gallery at Rozelle House, Ayr
 Manchester Art Gallery
 Morley College, London
 Museum Boijmans Van Beuningen, Rotterdam
 Museum of Fine Arts, Boston
 Museum of Modern Art, New York
 National Museum Cardiff, National Museum Wales
 Nelson-Atkins Museum of Art, Kansas City
 Ruth Borchard Collection
 Southampton City Art Gallery
 Tate, London
 University of Warwick
 Walker Art Gallery, Liverpool
 Whitworth, Manchester

Influence

Artists Ross Bleckner and Philip Taaffe made paintings paying homage to the work of Riley in the 80s. In 2013, Riley claimed that a wall-sized, black-and-white checkerboard work by Tobias Rehberger plagiarised her painting Movement in Squares and asked for it to be removed from display at the Berlin State Library's reading room.

Recognition
In 1963, Riley was awarded the AICA Critics Prize as well as the John Moores, Liverpool Open Section Prize. A year later, she received a Peter Stuyvesant Foundation Travel bursary. In 1968, she received an International Painting Prize at the Venice Biennale. In 1974, she was named a Commander of the Most Excellent Order of the British Empire. Riley has been given honorary doctorates by Oxford (1993) and Cambridge (1995). In 2003, she was awarded the Praemium Imperiale, and, in 1998, she became one of only 65 Companions of Honour in Britain. As a board member of the National Gallery in the 1980s, she blocked Margaret Thatcher's plan to give an adjoining piece of property to developers and thus helped ensure the eventual construction of the museum's Sainsbury Wing. Riley has also received the Goslarer Kaiserring of the city of Goslar in 2009 and the 12th Rubens Prize of Siegen in 2012.

Philanthropy 
Riley is a Patron of Paintings in Hospitals, a charity established in 1959 to provide art for health and social care in England, Wales and Northern Ireland.

Between 1987 and 2014, she created three murals across the eighth, ninth and tenth floors of the Queen Elizabeth Queen Mother Wing, St Mary's Hospital, London.

In 2017, alongside Yoko Ono and Tracey Emin, Riley donated artworks to an auction to raise money for Modern Art Oxford.

Art market
In 2006, her Untitled (Diagonal Curve) (1966), a black-and-white canvas of dizzying curves, was bought by Jeffrey Deitch at Sotheby's for $2.1 million, nearly three times its $730,000 high estimate and also a record for the artist. In February 2008, the artist's dotted canvas Static 2 (1966) brought £1,476,500 ($2.9 million), far exceeding its £900,000 ($1.8 million) high estimate, at Christie's in London. Chant 2 (1967), part of the trio shown in the Venice Biennale, went to a private American collector for £2,561,250 ($5.1 million), in July 2008, at Sotheby's.

Bibliography
Bridget Riley: The Stripe Paintings 1961–2014 (New York: David Zwirner Books, 2014). Texts by Robert Kudielka, Paul Moorhouse, and Richard Shiff. 
 Bridget Riley: The Stripe Paintings 1961–2012 (London: Ridinghouse; Berlin: Holzwarth Publications and Galerie Max Hetzler, 2013). Texts by John Elderfield, Robert Kudielka and Paul Moorhouse. 
 Bridget Riley: Works 1960–1966 (London: Ridinghouse, 2012). Bridget Riley in conversation with David Sylvester (1967) and with Maurice de Sausmarez (1967).
 Bridget Riley: Complete Prints 1962–2012 (London: Ridinghouse, 2012). Essays by Lynn MacRitchie and Craig Hartley; edited by Karsten Schubert.
 The Eye's Mind: Bridget Riley. Collected Writings 1965–1999 (London: Thames & Hudson, Serpentine Gallery and De Montfort University, 1999). Includes conversations with Alex Farquharson, Mel Gooding, Vanya Kewley, Robert Kudielka, and David Thompson. Edited by Robert Kudielka.
 Bridget Riley: Paintings from the 60s and 70s (London: Serpentine Gallery, 1999). With texts by Lisa Corrin, Robert Kudielka, and Frances Spalding.
 Bridget Riley: Selected Paintings 1961–1999 (Düsseldorf: Kunstverein für die Rheinlande und Westfalen; Ostfildern: Cantz Publishers, 1999). With texts by Michael Krajewski, Robert Kudielka, Bridget Riley, Raimund Stecker, and conversations with Ernst H. Gombrich and Michael Craig-Martin.
 Bridget Riley: Works 1961–1998 (Kendal, Cumbria: Abbot Hall Art Gallery and Museum, 1998). A conversation with Isabel Carlisle.
 Bridget Riley: Dialogues on Art (London: Zwemmer, 1995). Conversations with Michael Craig-Martin, Andrew Graham Dixon, Ernst H. Gombrich, Neil MacGregor, and Bryan Robertson. Edited by Robert Kudielka and with an introduction by Richard Shone.
 Bridget Riley: Paintings and Related Work (London: National Gallery Company Limited, 2010). Text by Colin Wiggins, Michael Bracewell, Marla Prather and Robert Kudielka. .
 'Bridget Riley, Op art and the Sixties' (Thames and Hudson 2004), Frances Follin

References

External links

The Pace Gallery
Ongoing exhibitions of Bridget Riley
Bridget Riley exhibition at Abbot Hall Art Gallery, 1998-9
Jonathan Jones, The Life of Riley (interview), The Guardian, 5 July 2008
"At the end of my pencil" article by Bridget Riley, London Review of Books
Slideshow of paintings in Bridget Riley's Museum für Gegenwartskunst retrospective, 2012
Exhibition of Bridget Riley's work at Christchurch Art Gallery Te Puna o Waiwhetu, Christchurch, New Zealand, 2017
Interview with Bridget Riley, 1978 May 10, Archives of American Art, Smithsonian Institution

1931 births
Living people
20th-century English painters
21st-century English painters
20th-century English women artists
21st-century English women artists
Alumni of Goldsmiths, University of London
Alumni of Loughborough University
Alumni of the Royal College of Art
British abstract artists
British contemporary painters
British women curators
Commanders of the Order of the British Empire
English contemporary artists
English printmakers
English women painters
Members of the Academy of Arts, Berlin
Members of the Order of the Companions of Honour
Op art
Painters from London
People educated at Cheltenham Ladies' College
People from Lambeth
People from Vaucluse
Women printmakers